Adeney is a hamlet in the English county of Shropshire, in the civil parish of Edgmond.

Its name was formerly also spelt Adney, and derives from an Old English name meaning "Eadwynne's island". It lies in an area of the Weald Moors known as the "Birch Moors"; the closest villages are Edgmond, to the east, and Tibberton, to the north-west.

References

External links

Villages in Shropshire
Newport, Shropshire